The Australia Billie Jean King Cup team represents Australia in international women's tennis and is directed by Tennis Australia. The team played in the first ever tournament in 1963, and is one of four teams that has taken part in every single edition since.

The Australian national team is one of the most successful in world tennis. They are seven-time world champions and have reached a total of eighteen finals, second highest as Runners-up all-time behind United States. Between 1963 and 1980, the Australian team played in every single final except for three. However, in recent times the Australian team has had a comparative lack of success, only appearing in the World Group five times between 1995 and 2010, and never going beyond the first round. However, the team has experienced a resurgence in recent times, accumulating a 15–6 win–loss record since 2005 and returning to the World Group in 2011 and 2013. Samantha Stosur holds the record for most singles wins by an Australian in Fed Cup, while Wendy Turnbull holds the record for most doubles wins, most overall tie wins, and most ties participated in.

Alicia Molik is the current captain and has held that position since 2013. Currently, the team is No. 1 in the ITF rankings, their highest-ever rank since the inception of the rankings in 2002.

Current team

History

Players

Forty-four players have represented Fed Cup for Australia since its inception in 1963. Wendy Turnbull holds the record for the most ties played, having appeared in forty-five ties during her eleven-year Fed Cup career. Rennae Stubbs is second, with forty-one ties, although she had by far competed for more years than anyone else (with seventeen) before her retirement after the team's 2011 tie against Italy. Alicia Molik, the current captain, is tenth, having played in twenty-two ties, one less than the highest active player Samantha Stosur. Turnbull took the record for most ties in 1986, taking the record from current third Dianne Balestrat. Balestrat was also the youngest person to reach twenty ties, at 23 years old. Margaret Court and Evonne Goolagong Cawley share the record of people to reach twenty ties to have the highest winning percentage, with 35–5 or 0.875%.

Stosur holds the record for most Australia Fed Cup singles wins. She had her first win in 2004 against Napaporn Tongsalee, and went on to take the record from Balestrat nine years later after defeating Romina Oprandi in 2013. Court holds the record for most prolific singles player, averaging once win for every tie she played and also accumulating a 100% singles winning percentage. Court was also the first player to accumulate ten wins for the team, having achieved the feat in 1965. Nicole Bradtke was the youngest person to achieve her tenth win, doing so in April 1995 against Radka Zrubáková while aged 22 years, 1 month. Current captain Molik is once again tenth on this factor, sharing the record with Bradtke at twelve.

Turnbull holds the record for most doubles wins, accumulating twenty-nine wins before her final tie in 1988 against West Germany, and taking this record from Kerry Melville Reid, the current third, in 1982. Turnbull and Melville Reid together also hold the record for most doubles wins as a team, with eleven. Of the players that have achieved ten doubles wins, Judy Tegart Dalton was the most prolific, averaging 0.8 wins per tie. Goolagong Cawley achieved the highest win percentage, at 86.7%. Court was once again the first player to reach ten doubles wins, doing so after beating Winnie Shaw and Virginia Wade alongside Melville Reid in 1968. Stubbs, currently second, was the youngest person to achieve ten doubles wins, at 24 years, 1 month. Of the active players, Casey Dellacqua, tenth, has the most doubles wins at seven.

Jelena Dokic was the youngest player to compete for Australia, and also the youngest person to win a match for Australia when she defeated Mariana Díaz Oliva in 1998 aged 15 years, 3 months. Rennae Stubbs, on the other hand, was the oldest player to compete and win a match, winning her last match aged 39 years, 1 month, and playing her final tie aged 39 years, 10 months.

Top ten players

Singles

Doubles

*Active players in bold, statistics as of 1 February 2016.

Results

Records
In terms of time, the longest rubber involving an Australian player was Fabiola Zuluaga's 2003, 2–6, 7–6(7–4), 8–10, defeat of Alicia Molik, which took two-hour, forty-three minutes. However, the longest rubber in terms of games was Margaret Court and Kerry Reid's 1968, 9–7, 3–6, 14–12, defeat of Winnie Shaw and Virginia Wade, which lasted fifty-one games and holds the overall Fed Cup record. This match also holds the Australian Fed Cup record of most games in a set.

The longest tie in terms of time and games was the Italy–Australia match in 2011, which lasted for ten hours and twenty-six minutes and featured a hundred and forty-nine games. The match also holds the overall Fed Cup record for most tiebreaks in a tie with five. The Australian Fed Cup record for longest tiebreak was also set in 2011, with Anastasia Rodionova's, 6–7(3–7), 6–7(12–14), loss to Olga Savchuk.

Australia was also featured in two of the five 0–2 comebacks featured since inception. The Australian team defeated Canada in the competition's first ever 0–2 comeback in 1996, while Austria beat the team three years later for the second event.

The Australian team also holds the record for longest streak of consecutive finals, from 1973 to 1980. It was during this period that they accumulated their longest tie winning streak at eleven.

Longest winning streak

Finals: 19 (7 titles, 12 runners-up)

Head-to-head record

*Previous champions in bold, teams that have been ranked no. 1 in italics, statistics as of 19 April 2015.

Notes

References

External links

Billie Jean King Cup teams
Fed Cup
Fed